The 'Bombay' mango is a named mango cultivar that originated in Jamaica.

History 
Bombay was originally grown from a seed brought to Jamaica by immigrants from India during the Indian indenture system in the 19th century. The fruit became popular due to its widely accepted flavor, and Bombay was eventually introduced into the United States via south Florida, where it is now sold as nursery stock. 
A 2005 pedigree analysis of the Florida mango cultivars found that Bombay was a parent of several mangoes which originated in the state, including Bailey's Marvel, Jacquelin, and Zill. All were estimated to have been Haden x Bombay crosses.

Description 

The fruit averages less than a pound at maturity and typically remains mostly green, with little red blush. The flesh is dark orange and completely fiber-less. It has a flavor described as being rich and spicy. It is known for having an easily removable seed. 

The trees are vigorous in growth and form open canopies.

References 

Mango cultivars
Agriculture in Jamaica